In military terms, 2nd Brigade may refer to:

Australia
2nd Brigade (Australia)
2nd Light Horse Brigade

Canada
2nd Canadian Armoured Brigade
2 Canadian Mechanized Brigade Group

Croatia
2nd Guards Brigade (Croatia)

Estonia
2nd Infantry Brigade (Estonia)

France
2nd Armoured Brigade (France)

Germany
II Marine Brigade

Ireland
2nd Brigade (Ireland)

Japan
2nd Independent Mixed Brigade (Imperial Japanese Army)

New Zealand
2nd Infantry Brigade (New Zealand)

Poland
2nd Brigade, Polish Legions
2nd Armoured Brigade (Poland)
2nd Mountain Brigade (Poland)

Romania
2nd Infantry Brigade (Romania)
2nd Mountain Troops Brigade (Romania)

Serbia
2nd Land Force Brigade

South Africa
 2nd Infantry Brigade (South Africa)

Spain
 2nd Mixed Brigade

United Kingdom
2nd Armoured Brigade (United Kingdom)
2nd Cavalry Brigade (United Kingdom)
2nd Composite Mounted Brigade
2nd Gibraltar Brigade
2nd Guards Brigade (United Kingdom)
2nd Infantry Brigade (United Kingdom)
2nd London Infantry Brigade
2nd Mounted Brigade (United Kingdom)
2nd Signal Brigade (United Kingdom)
2nd Parachute Brigade (United Kingdom)

Artillery units
 2nd Brigade Royal Field Artillery
 II Brigade, Royal Horse Artillery 
 II Brigade, Royal Horse Artillery (T.F.),  Territorial Force
 II Indian Brigade, Royal Horse Artillery

United States
2nd Brigade, 1st Cavalry Division (United States)
2nd Brigade, 1st Infantry Division (United States)
2nd Brigade, 7th Infantry Division (United States)
2nd Brigade Combat Team, 10th Mountain Division (United States)
2nd Brigade, 24th Infantry Division (United States)
2nd Brigade, 34th Infantry Division (United States)
2nd Brigade, 104th Division (United States)
2nd Infantry Brigade (United States)
2nd Marine Expeditionary Brigade (United States)
2nd Vermont Brigade